The Wyoming Tribune Eagle is a daily newspaper published in Cheyenne and distributed primarily in Laramie County, Wyoming. It is the state's second largest newspaper in terms of circulation, behind the Casper Star Tribune. The Tribune Eagle is also one of several newspapers serving the Front Range Urban Corridor. The paper is a consolidation of the former Wyoming State Tribune (founded 1894, with heritage dating to 1867) and Wyoming Eagle (converted to a daily in 1926).  The McCraken family bought the Eagle in 1926 and the Tribune in 1937. Adams Publishing Group acquired the Tribune Eagle and the McCrakens' other newspappers in 2015.

References

External links
 

Newspapers published in Wyoming
Laramie County, Wyoming